Thabiso Lebitso (born 4 March 1992) is a South African soccer player who plays as a midfielder for South African Premier Division side Chippa United.

Career
In December 2019, Lebitso signed for South African Premier Division side Chippa United from Tshwane University of Technology.

References

Living people
1992 births
South African soccer players
Association football midfielders
Chippa United F.C. players
South African Premier Division players